Samuel Woody Narron (August 25, 1913 – December 31, 1996) was an American Major League Baseball player and coach. He was the uncle of Major League catcher, coach and manager Jerry Narron and MLB coach Johnny Narron, and the grandfather of pitcher Sam Narron.

Narron spent almost his entire playing career in minor league baseball. Originally an outfielder, he led the Class D Georgia–Florida League in batting average with a .349 mark in 1936. The following year, he became a catcher and twice batted over .300 for the Rochester Red Wings of the AA International League.

In the Major Leagues, Narron appeared in parts of three seasons (1935, 1942 and 1943) with the St. Louis Cardinals, playing in 24 games and hitting .286 with one run batted in in just 28 at bats.

A protégé of longtime MLB executive Branch Rickey, Narron continued in baseball after his playing career ended in 1948. He was the bullpen catcher for the Brooklyn Dodgers during 1949 and 1950, the last two years of Rickey's tenure there, then followed him to the Pittsburgh Pirates as the Buccos' Major League bullpen coach from 1951 through 1964.

He was inducted in the Kinston Professional Baseball Hall of Fame in 1988. Sam Narron died in Raleigh, North Carolina, at the age of 83.

References

External links

Baseball Almanac

1913 births
1996 deaths
Albany Travelers players
Asheville Tourists players
Baseball coaches from North Carolina
Baseball players from North Carolina
Houston Buffaloes players
Major League Baseball bullpen catchers
Major League Baseball bullpen coaches
Major League Baseball catchers
Martinsville Manufacturers players
Mobile Bears players
Montreal Royals players
People from Nash County, North Carolina
Pittsburgh Pirates coaches
Rochester Red Wings players
Sacramento Solons players
St. Louis Cardinals players
St. Paul Saints (AA) players